The Fairfield County Courthouse, also known as the Court of Common Pleas, is located at 172 Golden Hill Street in downtown Bridgeport, Connecticut.  It is also known as Geographical Area (GA) Courthouse No. 2 at Bridgeport.  It is a Richardsonian Romanesque brick building built in 1888.  It was listed on the National Register of Historic Places in 1982.   It still functions as a courthouse where all but the most serious criminal cases are heard.

History
In 1886, when the then-current city hall/county courthouse (now McLevy Hall) proved insufficient for both the growing needs of Bridgeport and Fairfield County, the county decided to build a new courthouse. Norwalk bid for the new courthouse to be moved there, offering $100,000 towards construction, but the Bridgeport group, including P.T. Barnum, offered $150,000.  The building was designed by Bridgeport architect Warren R. Briggs, and was completed and opened in 1888.

Architecture

The Fairfield County Courthouse stands on the northside of downtown Bridgeport, on the north side of Golden Hill Street just west of Main Street.  It is a three story masonry structure, with its exterior clad in brick with brownstone and terra cotta trim.  It is set on a high foundation of ashlar granite.  The main facade is dominated by a six-story tower at its center, which is capped by a pyramidal roof.  The building corners are adorned with crenellated turrets.  The main entrance is to one side of the tower, in the center of a series of large round-arch bays, with flanking granite columns.

See also

History of Bridgeport, Connecticut
National Register of Historic Places listings in Bridgeport, Connecticut

References

National Register of Historic Places in Fairfield County, Connecticut
Government buildings completed in 1888
Richardsonian Romanesque architecture in Connecticut
Buildings and structures in Bridgeport, Connecticut
Courthouses on the National Register of Historic Places in Connecticut
County courthouses in Connecticut
Historic district contributing properties in Connecticut